The Little Malheur River is a  tributary of the North Fork Malheur River in the eastern part of the U.S. state of Oregon. Beginning on the flanks of Bullrun Rock in the Monument Rock Wilderness of the Blue Mountains, the river flows generally south through parts of two national forests, Wallowa–Whitman and Malheur to meet the North Fork at Horse Flat, north of Juntura. Despite its short length, it flows through parts of four counties, listed from source to mouth: Baker, Grant, Malheur, and Harney.

In 2002, fire burned much of the forest along the canyon of the upper river. The Little Malheur Trail, maintained by the United States Forest Service, follows the river for about  through the wildfire area.

See also 
 List of rivers of Oregon

References

External links
 Malheur Watershed Council

Rivers of Oregon
Rivers of Baker County, Oregon
Rivers of Grant County, Oregon
Rivers of Harney County, Oregon
Rivers of Malheur County, Oregon
Wallowa–Whitman National Forest
Malheur National Forest